The 2018 Enfield Council election took place on Thursday 3 May 2018 to elect members of Enfield London Borough Council in London, England. The whole council was up for election and the Labour party retained overall control of the council.

Background
The last election in 2014 saw Labour winning a majority with 41 seats, compared with 22 for the Conservatives. No other parties held seats.
This was the first time that Labour were re-elected for a third term.

Results summary

Ward results

Bowes 

Chibah was a councillor for Turkey Street ward prior to the election.

Bush Hill Park

Chase 
Dino Lemonides resigned from the Labour Party and joined Community First.

Cockfosters 

Hayward was a councillor for Winchmore Hill ward prior to the election.

Georgiou was a councillor for Southgate Green ward prior to the election.

Smith was a councillor for Southgate ward prior to the election.

Edmonton Green 

Pearce was a councillor for Southgate ward prior to the election.

Enfield Highway 

Eren was first elected as a councillor in a by election in December 2017.

Dines was a councillor for Chase ward prior to the election.

Enfield Lock

Grange

Haselbury 

Lavender was a councillor for Cockfosters ward prior to the election.

Highlands 

Laban was a councillor for Town ward prior to the election.

Ekechi was a councillor for Upper Edmonton ward prior to the election.

Jubilee 

Caliskan was first elected as a councillor in a by election in May 2015.

Jukes was a councillor for Grange ward prior to the election.

Lower Edmonton

Palmers Green

Ponders End 
Ayfer Orhan resigned from the Labour Party, sits in the Community First group and has joined the Liberal Democrats .

Southbury 

Keazor was a councillor for Enfield Lock ward prior to the election.

Southgate 
Stephanos Ioannou was suspended from the Conservative Party in 2018, he has since been readmitted.

Charith Gunawardena and Derek Levy both resigned from the Labour Party, with Levy joining Community First and Gunawardena joining the Green Party.

Southgate Green 
Daniel Anderson and Anne Brown both resigned from the Labour Party and joined Community First.
Anne Brown then joined the Green Party.

Town 

Jiagge was a councillor for Upper Edmonton ward prior to the election.

Turkey Street

Upper Edmonton

Winchmore Hill 

Dinah Barry resigned from the Labour Party and joined Community First. She is the leader of the Community First group on Enfield Council.

By-elections

Chase

Jubilee

Southbury

Bush Hill Park

References

2018
2018 London Borough council elections